HD 126209, also known as HR 5389, is a solitary, orange hued star located in the southern circumpolar constellation Apus. It has an apparent magnitude of 6.06, making it faintly visible to the naked eye under ideal conditions. Based on parallax measurements from the Gaia spacecraft, the object is estimated to be 560 light years distant. De Mederios et al. (2014) found the radial velocity to be variable, making it a probable spectroscopic binary. Eggen (1993) lists it as a member of the old disk population.

This is an evolved red giant with a spectral classification of K0/1 III. This indicates that it has the spectrum intermediate of a K0 and K1 giant. It has 1.22 times the mass of the Sun and due to its evolved state, expanded to 16.8 times its girth. HD 126209 is said to be metal deficent, having an iron abundance only half of the Sun's.

References

K-type giants

Apus (constellation)
Apodis, 11

5389
PD-76 00826
126209
070874